Hackney may refer to:

Places

London 
 Hackney, London, a district in London
 Hackney (parish), the originally medieval ancient parish
 Hackney District (Metropolis), a local government district within the metropolitan area of London from 1855 to 1894
 Metropolitan Borough of Hackney, a local government area based on the ancient parish boundaries from 1900 to 1965
 London Borough of Hackney, a local authority area created in 1965
 Hackney Central, a sub-district of Hackney which forms the commercial and administrative centre
 Hackney Wick, a sub-district of Hackney
 South Hackney, a sub-district of Hackney
 West Hackney, a sub-district of Hackney
 Hackney Central railway station
 Hackney Downs railway station
 Hackney Wick railway station
 Hackney Downs, an open space in Hackney
 Hackney Marshes, an open space in Hackney
 Hackney North and Stoke Newington (UK Parliament constituency)
 Hackney (UK Parliament constituency)
 Hackney South and Shoreditch (UK Parliament constituency)
 Hackney Central (ward), a political division of the council
 Hackney Downs (ward), a political division of the council
 Hackney College
 Hackney Wick Stadium
 Hackney Empire, a theatre and concert venue
 Hackney RFC, a rugby union club

Elsewhere
 Hackney, Derbyshire, a village near the town of Matlock, England
 Hackney, Guyana, a village
 Hackney, Kansas, United States
 Hackney, Missouri, United States
 Hackney, South Australia, a suburb of Adelaide, Australia

People
 Hackney (surname)

Other uses
 Hackney (automobile)
 Hackney Flashers English socialist-feminist photography collective 
 Hackney horse, a breed of horse known for its high trotting action, particularly in harness
 Hackney pony, a pony breed with similar characteristics as the Hackney horse, but much smaller.
 Hackney carriage, taxicabs in London and elsewhere popularly known as 'black cabs'
 Hackney, a type of taxicab in the Republic of Ireland which cannot be "hailed" on the street (see Taxicabs by country)